Brosimum is a genus of plants in the family Moraceae, native to tropical regions of the Americas.

The breadnut (B. alicastrum) was used by the Maya civilization for its edible nut. The dense vividly colored scarlet wood of B. paraense is used for decorative woodworking. B. guianense, or snakewood, has a mottled snake-skin pattern, and is among the densest woods, with a very high stiffness; it was the wood of choice for making of bows for musical instruments of the violin family until the late 18th century, when it was replaced by the more easily worked brazilwood (Paubrasilia echinata). Plants of this genus are otherwise used for timber, building materials, and in a cultural context.

Accepted species
 Brosimum acutifolium—tamamuri
 Brosimum alicastrum Sw.—breadnut, Maya nut, ramón (Spanish)
 Brosimum costaricanum Liebm.
 Brosimum gaudichaudii Trecul—Mama-cadela
 Brosimum glaucum Taub.
 Brosimum glaziovii Taub.
 Brosimum guianense (Aubl.) Huber—"snakewood" (= B. aubletii)
 Brosimum lactescens (S.Moore) C.C.Berg
 Brosimum longifolium Ducke
 Brosimum melanopotamicum C.C.Berg
 Brosimum multinervium C.C.Berg
 Brosimum parinarioides Ducke
 Brosimum parinarioides ssp. amplicoma (Ducke) C.C.Berg (= B. amplicoma)
 Brosimum parinarioides ssp. parinarioides
 Brosimum potabile
 Brosimum rubescens Taub.—Satine bloodwood
 Brosimum utile (Kunth) Pittier (= B. galactodendron)

Formerly placed here
 Pseudolmedia spuria (Sw.) Griseb. (as B. spurium Sw.)

Footnotes

References

   (2004): Wood for Woodturners. Guild of Master Craftsmen Publications, Sussex. 

 
Moraceae genera